New Jersey Institute of Technology (NJIT) is a public research university in Newark, New Jersey with a graduate-degree-granting satellite campus in Jersey City. Founded in 1881 with the support of local industrialists and inventors especially Edward Weston,  NJIT opened as Newark Technical School (NTS) in 1885 with 88 students. The school grew into a classic engineering college – Newark College of Engineering (NCE) – and then with the addition of a School of Architecture in 1973, into a polytechnic university that now hosts five colleges and one school. As of fall 2021 the university enrolls about 11,900 students from 83 countries, 2,500 of whom live on its main campus in Newark's University Heights district.

NJIT offers 51 undergraduate (Bachelor of Science/Arts) majors and 71 graduate (Masters and PhD) programs. Via its Honors College it also offers professional programs in Healthcare and Law in collaboration with nearby institutions including Rutgers Medical School and Seton Hall Law School. Cross-registration with Rutgers University-Newark which borders its campus is also available. NJIT is classified among "R1: Doctoral Universities – Very high research activity". It operates the Big Bear Solar Observatory, the Owens Valley Radio Observatory (both in California) and a suite of automated observatories across Antarctica, South America and the US.

As of May 2022 the school's founders, faculty and alumni include a Turing Award winner (2011), a Dannie Heineman Prize for Mathematical Physics winner (2015), 9 members of the National Academy of Engineering, 2 members of the National Inventors Hall of Fame, 1 member of the National Academy of Sciences, an astronaut, a National Medal of Technology and Innovation winner, a Congressional Gold Medal winner, a William Bowie Medal winner, multiple IEEE medalists and 18 members of the National Academy of Inventors including 6 senior members. Over the past 20 years NJIT graduates have won seventeen Goldwaters, six Fulbrights, a Truman, six Borens, seven Gilmans, five DAADs, a Tau Beta Pi graduate Fellowship, a Humanity in Action Fellowship, a RGSP scholarship, a Brooke Owens Fellowship, two Whitakers, and nineteen NSF Graduate Research Fellowships.

NJIT is a member of the Sea grant and Space grant research consortia. It has participated in the McNair Scholars Program since 1999. With 19 varsity teams, the NCAA Division I "Highlanders" mainly compete in the America East Conference.

History

Founding and early years
The New Jersey Institute of Technology has a history dating back to the 19th century. Originally introduced from Essex County on March 24, 1880, and revised with input from the Newark Board of Trade in 1881, an act of the New Jersey State Legislature essentially drew up a contest to determine which municipality would become home to the state's urgently needed technical school. The challenge was straightforward: the state would stake "at least $3,000 and not more than $5,000" and the municipality that matched the state's investment would earn the right to establish the new school.

The Newark Board of Trade, working jointly with the Newark City Council, launched a campaign to win the new school. Dozens of the city's industrialists, along with other private citizens, eager for a work force resource in their home town, threw their support behind the fund-raiser. By 1884, the collaboration of the public and private sectors produced success. Newark Technical School was ready to open its doors.

The first 88 students, mostly evening students, attended classes in a rented building at 21 West Park Street. Soon the facility became inadequate to house an expanding student body. To meet the needs of the growing school, a second fund-raiser—the institution's first capital campaign—was launched to support the construction of a dedicated building for Newark Technical School. In 1886, under the leadership of the school's dynamic first director, Dr. Charles A. Colton, the cornerstone was laid at the intersection of High Street and Summit Place for the three-story building later to be named Weston Hall, in honor of the institution's early benefactor. A laboratory building, later to be called Colton Hall, was added to the campus in 1911.

Becoming Newark College of Engineering

 Dr. Allan R. Cullimore led the institution from 1920 to 1949, transforming Newark Technical School into Newark College of Engineering (name adopted in 1930). Campbell Hall was erected in 1925, but due to the Depression and World War II, only the former Newark Orphan Asylum, now Eberhardt Hall, was purchased and renovated by the college in the succeeding decades. Cullimore left an unpublished history of the institution dated 1955.

As of 1946, about 75% of the freshman class had served in the U. S. Armed Forces. Cullimore Hall was built in 1958 and two years later the old Weston Hall was razed and replaced with the current seven-story structure.

Becoming New Jersey Institute of Technology

With the addition of the New Jersey School of Architecture in 1973, the institution had evolved into a technological university, emphasizing a broad range of graduate and undergraduate degrees and dedicated to significant research and public service. President William Hazell, Jr., felt that the name of the school should clearly communicate this dynamic evolution.  Alumni were solicited for suggestions to rename the institution, with the winning suggestion coming from Joseph M. Anderson '25.

Anderson's suggestion – New Jersey Institute of Technology – cogently emphasized the increasing scope of educational and research initiatives at a preeminent New Jersey university. The Board of Trustees approved the transition to the new name in September 1974, and Newark College of Engineering officially became New Jersey Institute of Technology on January 1, 1975. Anderson received the personal congratulations of President Hazell. At that time, the Newark College of Engineering name was retained for NJIT's engineering school.

 The establishment of a residential campus and the opening of NJIT's first dormitory (Redwood Hall) in 1979 began a period of steady growth that continues today under the Landscape Master Plan. Two new schools were established at the university during the 1980s, the College of Science and Liberal Arts in 1982 and the School of Industrial Management in 1988. The Albert Dorman Honors College was established in 1994, and the newest school, the College of Computing Sciences, was created in 2001.

Recent history
On May 2, 2003 Robert A. Altenkirch was inaugurated as president. He succeeded Saul K. Fenster, who was named the university's sixth president in 1978. Altenkirch retired in 2011 and on January 9, 2012, NJIT Trustees named Joel Bloom president.

In 2003 the opening of the new Campus Center on the site of the former Hazell Hall centralized campus social events. Construction of a new Atrium, Bookstore, Information Desk, Dining Hall, computer lab, and new student organization offices continued into 2004. In 2005 a row of automobile chop shops adjacent to campus were demolished. In 2006 construction of a new off-campus residence hall by American Campus Communities commenced in the chop shops' location. The new hall, which opened in 2007, is dubbed the University Centre.

Also in 2005, Eberhardt Hall was fully renovated and re-inaugurated as the Alumni Center and the symbolic front door to the university. Its restored tower was the logo of the former Newark College of Engineering and was designed by Kevin Boyajian and Scott Nelson. A rebranding campaign with the current slogan, "NJIT – New Jersey's Science and Technology University – The Edge in Knowledge", was launched to emphasize NJIT's unique position as New Jersey's preeminent science-and-technology-focused research university.

Recently, the school changed its accredited management school into an AACSB-accredited business school. The business school focuses on utilizing technology to serve business needs. The school benefits from its proximity to New York City; in particular, Wall Street is just twenty-five minutes away. The school also has a strong academic collaboration with the nearby Rutgers business school. In 2008 NJIT began a program with the Heritage Institute of Technology (HIT) in West Bengal, India under which 20 HIT students come to NJIT for summer internships.

In 2009 the New Jersey School of Architecture was reorganized as the College of Architecture and Design (CoAD). Within the college, the New Jersey School of Architecture continues, and it was joined by the newly established School of Art + Design.

In June 2010, NJIT officially completed its purchase of the old Central High School building which sits between the NJIT and Rutgers–Newark campuses. With the completion of the purchase, Summit Street, from Warren Street to New Street, was converted into a pedestrian walkway. Subsequently, the Central High School building was extensively renovated, preserved, and updated per the Campus Master Plan, which included tearing down Kupfrian Hall to create more greenery.

Facilities added in 2016-18 include: a 209,000 sq.ft., multi-purpose Wellness and Events Center (WEC) which features a retractable-seating arena that can accommodate 3,500 spectators or 4,000 event participants; a 24,000 sq. ft. Life Sciences and Engineering Center; a 10,000 sq. ft. Makerspace, and a parking garage with spaces for 933 cars.

The university awarded 2,951 degrees in 2017, including 1512 bachelor's, 1281 master's, and 59 PhDs. Enrollment, currently at 11,423, is projected to reach 12,200 by 2020.

Academics

Admissions
The admission criteria consists of:
 High school academic record
 Standardized test scores (SAT or ACT scores)
 Class rank
 Portfolio: Applicants to the Architecture, Digital Design, Industrial Design, and Interior Design majors are        required to submit a portfolio of their creative work.

The average SAT score (math + verbal only) for enrolling freshmen in fall 2021 is 1307.

The average SAT score (math + verbal only) for enrolling freshmen in the Honors College in fall 2021 is 1496.

The minimum SAT score (math + verbal only) for enrolling freshmen in the accelerated BS/MD program – run in combination with New Jersey Medical School (Rutgers) – is 1450.

The male-to-female student ratio (2021) is about 2.57 to 1. The student-to-faculty (FTE) ratio (2021) is 17.1 to 1.

Rankings 

 In June 2022 in a money.com article entitled "The Best 10 Colleges for Engineering Majors", NJIT was cited for its economic mobility performance and ranked 10th best in the country. 
 In May 2022 NJIT was ranked 14th in money.com's list of the 25 best colleges in the US.  
 In the 2021 edition of the QS World University Ranking USA, NJIT was ranked 90th (2-way tie) out of the 352 US Institutions listed (more than 750 considered).
 In the 2020 edition of the QS World University Rankings: USA, NJIT was ranked 74th. The ranking listed 302 US institutions.
 In April 2018 Forbes ranked NJIT #1 in the country in upward mobility defined in terms of moving students from the bottom fifth of the income distribution to the top fifth.
 In U.S. News 2018 on-line rankings, four of NJIT's suite of on-line graduate programs were ranked among the best 100 in the country, including its information technology programs, which were ranked 17th.
 In Payscale's 2017 College ROI Report, which covers 1833 institutions, NJIT ranked 27th and 42nd for return on investment, based on in-state and out-of-state tuition respectively.
 NJIT placed 133rd out of 662 universities in the US in R&D expenditures in 2016 by the National Science Foundation (NSF).
 In 2015, NJIT was ranked in the top 25 colleges for earning six figures before attaining a graduate degree in Time's Moneys list.

Colleges and schools
Comprising five colleges and one school, the university is organized into 21 departments, three of which, Biological Sciences, History, and Theater Arts are federated with Rutgers-Newark whose campus abuts NJIT's.

With a student population that is 13.5% international, 26.3% black or Hispanic, and 19.8% Asian (2022), NJIT is among the most ethnically diverse national universities in the country.

It has multiple study abroad options along with extensive co-op, internship, and service opportunities.

Newark College of Engineering (NCE)
Newark College of Engineering, which was established in 1919, is one of the oldest and largest professional engineering schools in the United States. It offers 13 undergraduate degree programs, 16 master's and 10 doctoral degree programs. Undergraduate enrollment is more than 2,500, and more than 1,100 are enrolled in graduate study. The 150-member faculty includes engineers and scholars who are widely recognized in their fields. An estimated one in four professional engineers in the State of New Jersey are NCE alumni. The NCE has more 40,000 living alumni.

College of Science and Liberal Arts (CSLA)
The College of Science and Liberal Arts was formed in 1982. It was originally known as the Third College having been preceded by Newark College of Engineering and the New Jersey School of Architecture. In 1986 its name was changed to the College of Science and Liberal Arts as a result of a more sharply defined mission and direction. Growing steadily ever since, CSLA has spawned two of NJIT's colleges: the Albert Dorman Honors College, which evolved out of the Honors Program that was founded in CSLA in 1985, and the College of Computing Sciences, which developed out of CSLA's Computer and Information Science Department.

Today the college consists of six academic departments:
 Biological Sciences
 Chemistry and Environmental Science
 Federated History
 Humanities
 Mathematical Sciences
 Physics

CSLA also houses:
 Department of Aerospace Studies
 Rutgers/NJIT Theatre Arts Program
 Interdisciplinary Program in Materials Science
 Center for Applied Mathematics and Statistics
 Center for Solar Research
 Big Bear Solar Observatory
 Owens Valley Solar Array

J. Robert and Barbara A. Hillier College of Architecture and Design (HCAD)
The College of Architecture and Design houses the School of Architecture (SoA) and the School of Art and Design. The college offers undergraduate degrees in architecture, digital design, industrial design, and interior design as well as graduate degrees in architecture, infrastructure planning, and urban systems.  HCAD is the only college at NJIT to have its own designated library.  The library contains materials related to the majors offered in HCAD in the form of periodicals, reference materials, rare books, visual materials (i.e. architectural drawings, prints, postcards, maps, etc.), digital databases, and a materials library.

The college offers a pre-college summer program for high school students.

Albert Dorman Honors College (ADHC)

Ying Wu College of Computing Sciences (YWCC)
The Computer Science department, part of the Ying Wu College of Computing Sciences, is the largest at NJIT, comprising more than one fifth of the student population.  It is also the largest computer science department among all research universities in the New York metropolitan area.

The department offers a full range of degree programs in computer science (BA/BS, MS and PhD), in addition to emerging interdisciplinary  programs: Telecommunication (MS), Bioinformatics (BS/MS), and Computing and Business (BS/MS). The Bioinformatics degree is also available in a pre-med option.

In December 2019, the school opened a satellite site in Jersey City that focuses on financial technology training for those working in the financial industry on Wall Street and in Jersey City.

Martin Tuchman School of Management (MTSM)
The Martin Tuchman School of Management was established in 1988 and was accredited by the Association to Advance Collegiate Schools of Business in 1997. It offers programs in finance, accounting, marketing, management information systems, international business, technological entrepreneurship, and corporate communications in conjunction with Rutgers University.

Degrees available include a Bachelor of Science program (four years, 124 credits), a Master of Science in management program (30 credits), and two Master of Business Administration (MBA) programs: One regular (48 credits; two years for full-time students, three or four years for part-time students) and the other an accelerated 18-month Executive MBA program for managers and professionals. MTSM also offers a Ph.D. degree in Business Data Science.  Research areas include fintech, innovation management, and the advancement of technologies in the business domain including deep learning and distributed ledgers.

MTSM hosts entrepreneurship programs for the regional community, including the NSF I-Corps, the New Venture Assistance Program, and the Greater Newark–Jersey City Regional Business Model Competition.

Research

NJIT's R&D expenditures were $142 million in 2017 and $162 million in 2018.  Areas of focus include applied mathematics, materials science, biomedical engineering, cybersecurity, and solar-terrestrial physics – of which the Center for Solar-Terrestrial Research is a world leader. A key agent in regional economic development, NJIT hosts  VentureLink, formally the Enterprise Development Center (EDC), an on-campus business incubator that houses over 90 start-ups, and the New Jersey Innovation Institute (NJII) which offers R&D services to business.

The university has performed research in nanotechnology, solar-terrestrial physics, polymer science, and the development of a smart gun technology. The university research centers include the National Center for Transportation and Industrial Productivity and SmartCampus. The university hosts the Metro New York FIRST Robotics office. The university also hosts the Center for Solar-Terrestrial Research which owns and operates the Big Bear Solar Observatory, the world's largest solar observatory, located in Big Bear Lake, California, and operates the Owens Valley Solar Array, near Bishop, California.

In the past, NJIT was home to the Computerized Conferencing and Communications Center (CCCC), a research center that specialized in computer-mediated communication. The systems that resulted from this research are the Electronic Information Exchange System, as well as the continuations: The Electronic Information Exchange System 2 (EIES2), and the Tailorable Electronic Information Exchange System (TEIES). One of the foremost developments of EIES was that of the "Virtual Classroom", a term coined by Dr. Starr Roxanne Hiltz. This was the first e-learning platform in the world, and was unique in that it evolved onto an existing communications system, rather than having a system created specifically for it. Their missions completed, the CCCC and EIES were terminated in the mid-90s.

The university currently operates a Class-10 cleanroom and a Class-1000 cleanroom on campus for academic and research purposes including counter-bioterrorism research.

The university also maintains an advanced 67-node supercomputer cluster in its Mathematics Department for research purposes.

NJIT conducts cybersecurity research in a number of areas including cross-domain information sharing, data security and privacy, data mining for malware detection, geospatial information security, secure social networks, and secure cloud computing. The university is designated a National Center of Academic Excellence (CAE) in Cyber Defense Education through the 2020 academic year by the National Security Agency and Department of Homeland Security.

Libraries and archives supporting research
NJIT's Main Library, The Robert W. Van Houten Library, is located in the Central Avenue Building, a facility for quiet and group study, researching, and browsing print and online sources.  Since 1997 the Van Houten Information Commons has housed 120 computer workstations.

The Barbara and Leonard Littman Library for Architecture and Design is located in Weston Hall.  It houses a core collection that includes print and electronic books, journals, maps, drawings, models, e-images, materials samples, and over 70,000 slides.

Included among NJIT's information resources are the university's historical archive including items developed and manufactured by Edward Weston, a scientist, prolific inventor, and a founding member of the board of trustees of the university. Dr. Weston's collection of artifacts and rare books is housed in the Van Houten Library and is available to scholars interested in the history of science and technology.

Residence life

Living: on-campus
About 80% of NJIT students commute to campus. The Residence Life (on-campus) community currently includes a little over 2,500 students.

There are six residence halls on the NJIT campus. Redwood Hall, constructed in 1978, was the first, followed by Cypress, Oak, and Laurel (constructed in 1997 and extended in 1999). Cypress and Redwood are primarily used for freshman students, while Laurel and Oak house upperclassmen. The fifth, Warren Street Village, which opened in the fall of 2013, provides housing for Dorman Honors College students and several Greek houses which together provide space for about 600 students. The Warren Street Village also houses the Albert Dorman Honors College itself. A sixth dorm hall, Maple Hall, which accommodates 500 students opened in the Fall of 2022.

Living: off-campus
A new almost-on-campus resident hall known as University Centre (run by American Campus Communities) was completed in 2007. Located near NJIT's Guttenberg Information Technologies Center (GITC) building, it houses students from NJIT, Rutgers–Newark, Rutgers Medical School and Seton Hall University. Many students from local institutions find housing in nearby neighborhoods and towns including Harrison, Kearny, Fairmount and East Orange.

Student newspaper
The Vector is an independent weekly student newspaper published by the students of NJIT, originally established in 1924. It has both on-line and print versions. The tabloid print edition has an estimated circulation of 3,000 from on-campus distribution and a readership of approximately 9,000.
The Vector won the Honor Rating of First Class from the Associated Collegiate Press in 1989–1990. The Vector is a current member of the Associated Collegiate Press. The Vector won two awards in the New Jersey Press Foundation's 2019-2020 awards, scoring a second place win for Arts & Entertainment writing and third place for General Excellence.

Athletics

Sports/Teams
NJIT sponsors 19 NCAA-Division I varsity teams and 1 ACHA non-varsity Division 2 team.   It also sponsors 6 club-level sports.  Its teams are called the Highlanders. The school colors are red and white with blue accent. NJIT's teams compete at the NCAA Division I level primarily as members of the America East Conference (AEC). Several teams have affiliations outside of AEC as follows: Woman's and Men's tennis compete in the Southland Conference (SLC), Men's fencing team is a member of the Mid-Atlantic Collegiate Fencing Association (MACFA). As of 2016, the women's fencing team is independent. Men's volleyball competes in the Eastern Intercollegiate Volleyball Association (EIVA).

On 6 December 2014 NJIT's basketball team, unranked and independent at the time, made headlines in national sports reports when they defeated the nationally ranked (#17) Michigan Wolverines.

NCAA Division I sports at NJIT are:
 (M)     Baseball
 (M) (W) Basketball
 (M) (W) Cross country
 (M) (W) Fencing, men compete in MACFA, woman compete as an independent
 (M)     Lacrosse
 (M) (W) Soccer
 (M)     Swimming & diving
 (M) (W) Tennis, compete in SLC
 (M) (W) Track & field (indoor)
 (M) (W) Track & field (outdoor)
 (M) (W) Volleyball, men compete in EIVA

ACHA Division II sports:
 (M)     Ice Hockey, compete in CSCHC

Club-level sports:
Bowling, Cricket, Ice Hockey, Mixed Martial Arts, Ultimate Frisbee

Sports and Recreational Facilities

In recent years NJIT has extensively added to and upgraded its sports and recreation facilities.  In 2017 it opened the Wellness and Events Center (referred to as "the WEC," pronounced "weck"), a major facility that includes a 3500-seat Basketball/Volleyball arena that can be converted into an event space capable of accommodating 4,000 attendees. In 2019 a new Soccer/Lacrosse field was opened. The WEC replaced the Estelle & Zoom Fleisher Athletic Center.

Notable alumni
Since its founding in 1881, NJIT has issued degrees to more than 77,000 graduates. NJIT alumni have gone on to pursue distinguished careers in many sectors.

Faculty and administrators at other universities
 A. Michael Noll (class of 1961), dean at University of Southern California
 Judea Pearl (class of 1961), professor at University of California, Los Angeles; winner of Turing Award (Nobel Prize of Computing) in 2011 (co-listed under Science and Engineering)
 John Pelesko, (class of 1997) earned his PhD at NJIT, a professor and associate dean at the University of Delaware
 Pierre Ramond (class of 1965), distinguished professor of physics at University of Florida
 Victor J. Stenger (class of 1956), professor of physics at University of Hawaii who authored nine books
 Yuriy Tarnawsky (class of 1956), professor of Ukrainian literature and culture at Columbia University
 Charles Speziale (class of 1970), scientist at NASA Langley Research Center and professor at Boston University

Business and industry
 Albert Dorman (class of 1945, Hon ScD 1999) founder and chairman (ret) of AECOM Technology Corp., a member of the National Academy of Engineering, a fellow of the American Institute of Architects, and a distinguished member of the American Society of Civil Engineers.
 Ying Wu (MSEE 1988) Telecommunications engineer and entrepreneur, Chairman of the China Capital group.  Founder and ex-CEO of UTStarcom (China) Ltd.
 Ehsan Bayat (born 1963, class of 1986), chairman and founder of Afghan Wireless Communication Company, Ariana Television and Radio, Bayat Foundation, Bayat Energy
 Robert S. Dow (born 1945, class of 1969), senior partner, former managing partner of Lord Abbett, and Olympic fencer (He is also listed under Sports.)
 Frederick Eberhardt (class of 1884), president of Gould & Eberhardt, a Newark-based machine tool manufacturer, and one of 88 in NJIT's inaugural class
 Vince Naimoli (class of 1962), owner of the Tampa Bay Devil Rays
 Victor Pelson (deceased, class of 1959), American executive at AT&T Corporation.
 Jim Stamatis (class of 1985), vice president at Louis Berger Group
 Dick Sweeney (class of 1981), co-founder of Keurig

Military, politics and government
 Harry L. Ettlinger (born 1926, class of 1950), one of the Monuments Men; awarded the Congressional Gold Medal in 2015,
 Ellen M. Pawlikowski (class of 1978), 4-Star General of the United States Air Force  (retired August 2018), elected to the National Academy of Engineering in 2014,
 Paul Sarlo (born 1968, BS 1992, MS 1995), politician who has served in the New Jersey Senate since 2003, where he represents the 36th Legislative District,
 Funsho Williams (MSc 1974), Nigerian civil servant and politician.

Science and engineering

Sara Del Valle, (class of 2001), mathematical epidemiologist at the Los Alamos National Laboratory.
Judea Pearl, (class of 1961) prominent worker on superconducting electronic components and artificial intelligence. Winner of the Turing Award
 Pierre Ramond (class of 1965) Theoretical physicist who made significant contributions to string theory, winner of the Dannie Heineman Prize for Mathematical Physics (2015).
 Gerard J. Foschini, (class of 1961) prominent telecommunications engineer at Bell Labs, winner of the IEEE Alexander Graham Bell Medal. He is a member of the National Academy of Engineering.
 Beatrice Hicks (1919–1979, class of 1939), founder of the Society of Women Engineers and member of the National Academy of Engineering.
 Paul Charles Michaelis, (BSEE and MS Physics) researcher of magnetic bubble memory, received the IEEE Morris N. Liebmann Memorial Award in 1975.
 John J. Mooney (MSc 1960), co-inventor of the three-way catalytic converter, winner of National Medal of Technology in 2002.
 T. J. O'Malley (class of 1936), aerospace engineer, winner of the NASA Distinguished Public Service Medal, 1969, 1974.
 John Sawruk (1946–2008), mechanical engineer, Boss Kettering Award winner for his work on the GM 2.4L 4 cylinder engine 
 Wally Schirra (1923–2007), astronaut, only person to fly in all of America's first three space programs (Mercury, Gemini and Apollo)
 Victor J. Stenger (1935-2014) BSEE, class of 1956. Noted particle physicist, philosopher, and religious skeptic. Author of 13 books for the general reader, and numerous essays, many of which relate to the existence of God.

Entertainment
 Rashia Fisher, rapper who is known as Rah Digga and a member of Flipmode Squad (attended, but did not graduate)

Sports
 Raymond E. Blum (class of 1950), speed skater who competed in the 1948 Winter Olympics in St. Moritz, Switzerland
 Robert Dow (fencer) (class of 1969) He competed in the team sabre event in the 1972 Summer Olympics.
 Hernan "Chico" Borja (deceased, class of 1980) (soccer, player and coach) First NJIT men's player to be named an ALL American. He played for several professional teams including the New York Cosmos. He was a member of the US national team from 1982 to 1988.
 Isaiah Wilkerson (class of 2012), professional basketball player.
 Chris Flores (class of 2013), professional basketball player
 Mark Leiter Jr., (class of 2016) professional baseball player
 Damon Lynn (class of 2017), professional basketball player (NBA G League)

Notable faculty

University presidents
 Charles A. Colton, 1st Director (NTS), 1881–1918
 Daniel Hodgdon, 2nd Director (NTS), 1918–1920
 Allan Cullimore, 3rd Director (NTS), 1920–1930; 1st President (NCE), 1930–1947
 Robert Van Houten, acting President (NCE), 1947–1950; 2nd President (NCE), 1950-1970, class of 1930.              
 William Hazell, 3rd President (NCE)/(NJIT), 1970–1975
 Paul H. Newell Jr, 4th President (NJIT), 1975–1976
 Charles R. Bergman, 5th President (NJIT), Interim appointment, 1977  (NJIT) continues:
 Saul Fenster, 6th president, 1978–2002 
 Robert A. Altenkirch, 7th president, 2003–2011
 Joel Bloom, 8th president, 2012–2022
 Teik C. Lim, 9th president, 2022–present

Faculty and administrators at NJIT
 Ali Akansu, professor of electrical and computer engineering. He is an IEEE fellow.
 Julie Ancis, professor of Cyberpsychology. She is an American Psychological Association (APA) Fellow.
 David Bader, Distinguished Professor, Department of Computer Science in the Ying Wu College of Computing. He is an IEEE, AAAS, SIAM and ACM Fellow.
 Yeheskel Bar-Ness, professor emeritus of electrical and computer engineering. He is an IEEE Fellow.
 Denis Blackmore (deceased), professor of mathematics.
 Kevin Belfield, dean of NJIT's College of Science and Liberal Arts. He was elected a fellow of the American Chemical Society in 2020 and a fellow of the Royal Society of Chemistry in 2022.
 Jeannette Brown (deceased), chemist, historian, writer, Elected a fellow of the Association for Women in Science in 2007.
 Bernard Friedland, distinguished professor of electrical and computer engineering, recipient of the 1982 Rufus Oldenburger Medal
 Ian Gatley, professor of physics.
 Erol Gelenbe, professor of computer science at NJIT, dean at the University of Central Florida and professor at Imperial College London.
 Lillian Gilbreth, (deceased) professor at NJIT, 1941–43, and first female member of the National Academy of Engineering.
 Philip R. Goode, professor emeritus of physics. He is a Fellow of the American Physical Society, the American Geophysical Union and the American Astronomical Society.
 Craig Gotsman, Dean of the Ying Wu College of Computing, He is a Fellow of ACM, a member of Academia Europaea, and a member of the National Academy of Inventors.
 Starr Roxanne Hiltz, professor emerita of information systems, recipient of Electronic Frontier Foundation Pioneer Award (1994), co-author of 'The Network Nation' with her husband Murry Turoff.
 Michael Hinchey, professor of computer science at NJIT, and professor at the University of Limerick, Hinchey is a Member of Academia Europaea.
 Moshe Kam, Dean of the Newark College of Engineering, and professor of electrical and computer engineering. 49th President and CEO of IEEE.
 Burt Kimmelman, poet and professor of English. 
 Gregory Kriegsmann (deceased), professor of mathematics, elected as a Fellow of the Society for Industrial and Applied Mathematics (SIAM) in 1994.
 David Kristol, professor emeritus of biomedical engineering.
 Louis J. Lanzerotti, researcher and engineer involved in numerous satellite programs including Voyager, Cassini, and Galileo among others. He is a member of the National Academy of Engineering and an IEEE fellow.
 Paul Magriel, mathematics professor at NJIT, and leading backgammon player.
 Donald Pederson, (deceased) prominent electrical engineer who led the development of SPICE, a very widely used program for computer-aided circuit design. A lecturer of engineering at NJIT, Pederson was a member of the National Academy of Engineering, the National Academy of Sciences, and the American Academy of Arts and Sciences. He was awarded several IEEE medals including the medal of Honor.
 Brandon 'Scoop B' Robinson professor of humanities.
 Omowunmi Sadik, distinguished professor of chemistry and environmental science. She is a fellow of the American Institute for Medical and Biological Engineering, and a fellow of the Royal Society of Chemistry.
 Sunil Saigal, distinguished professor of civil engineering;  a Fellow of both the American Society of Mechanical Engineers and the American Society of Civil Engineers.
 Karl W. Schweizer, Professor of History; Author/Editor of 20 books; Fellow of the British Royal Historical Society and The Royal Society of Arts
 Kamalesh Sirkar, professor of chemical engineering. Sirkar holds 25 US patents.
 Murray Turoff, (deceased) professor emeritus of computer and information systems,  recipient of Electronic Frontier Foundation Pioneer Award (1994), co-author of 'The Network Nation' with his wife Starr Roxanne Hiltz.
 Guiling (Grace) Wang, Founding Director of the AI Center for Research at NJIT, Wang is an IEEE Fellow
 Leslie Kanes Weisman, professor of architecture.
 Edward Weston, (deceased) prominent member of the founding board of trustees; co-founder of the Weston Electric Light Company; holder of 334 US patients. Awards include: the Elliott Cresson Medal (1910), the Franklin Medal (1924), and the IEEE Lamme Medal.
 Mengchu Zhou, professor of electrical and computer engineering. He is also a professor at the Macau University of Science and Technology. He is the chairman of IKAS Industries of Shenzhen in China and a board member of OneSmart Education Group headquartered in China. He is a fellow of the IEEE, the American Association for the Advancement of Science and Chinese Association of Automation.

See also
 The Vector – student newspaper
 NJIT Capstone Program
 2007–08 NJIT Highlanders men's basketball team
 Arnold Air Society

Footnotes

References

External links

 
 NJIT Highlanders Athletics website

 
Universities and colleges in Newark, New Jersey
Engineering universities and colleges in New Jersey
Technological universities in the United States
Architecture schools in New Jersey
Business schools in New Jersey
Business incubators of the United States
Research institutes in New Jersey
Educational institutions established in 1881
1881 establishments in New Jersey
Public universities and colleges in New Jersey